Wuling Farm is a tourist attraction farm in Heping District, Taichung, Taiwan.

History
The farm was originally established in 1963 to provide employment for retired servicemen. At the beginning of the reclamation phase, the first director of the farm led veterans in opening up land to cultivate summer highland vegetables and temperate fruit trees. He then accepted the counsel of the Agricultural Revival Development Committee in setting the farm's management policy. In 1967, the land started to be developed by reforming land, planting fruit trees and setting up the vegetable planning. The farming area was also expanded and mechanical operation methods to effectively boost the efficiency and save on manpower were also developed. In 1986, the first phase of transformation was completed. Since 1989, the farm started to gradually develop facilities, such as camping grounds, garden, tea houses, hostels and tourist service center. After completion, the farm worked together with the Veterans Farm Committee in obtaining subsidies from the Tourism Bureau in order to expand its facilities over the coming few years. Since 1999, the farm started to implement its second phase of transformation, starting from the construction of its second hostel and outsourced its management team. It expanded and renovated its facilities on its garden, park, camping grounds, tea, electrical system and botanical garden.

Geology
The farm spans over 700 hectares of area located at an altitude of 1,740-2,100 meters in Shei-Pa National Park. It consists of flowers, fish farming, fruit plantation, vegetables and high mountain tea.

Facilities
The farm is equipped with camping ground, trails and garden.

Transportation
The farm is accessible by bus from Yilan Station, Fengyuan Station or Taipei Railway Station.

See also
 List of tourist attractions in Taiwan

References

External links

 

1963 establishments in Taiwan
Buildings and structures completed in 1963
Farms in Taichung